This is a list of County and Regional (collectively known as divisions) numbered roads  in Ontario. These roads are found only in Southern Ontario (with the lone exception being Greater Sudbury, which is in Northern Ontario), and are listed alphabetically by county, because more than one county can sometimes have the same county road number without connecting across county lines.

By their nature, all county roads in Ontario are numbered, unless noted. This page lists all of the county/district/regional roads by their respective county, district, or regional municipality.

Some counties have been merged in the past, and are known as "United Counties". They will be treated and named as one county.

The county road network has been present for many years, but has only been signed with the flowerpot logos since the early 1970s or 1980s (depending on the area). The signs are usually black text on white, or in some counties are multi-coloured.  Previously, the roads simply had road names, such as "Essex Road 42" or "Kent County Road 14", and so on, but had no shields to designate them.

County roads within still-extant counties are almost always rural routes and rarely run through towns. However, within regional municipalities, the systems were expanded to follow major streets in the formerly separated cities, or were retained within originally-rural townships that were incorporated as cities following mass suburbanization.

In addition to County Roads, many townships also have Concession roads and Township Roads, such as Colchester South Road 3, and Concession 8. These do not have shields (only names on signs and maps).  Some exceptions include former Highway 38 in Eastern Ontario, where the township name appears instead of the county as the township administers the road, or is not signed at all. Former Secondary Highway 620, downloaded to the Peterborough and Hastings County governments, was downloaded further to Wollaston Township (in Hastings County), with a posted sign appearing similar to an Ontario Tertiary Highway.

Glossary 
CR = County Road (or City Road, for those counties that have become City of  County, such as the City of Prince Edward County, Ontario)
DR = District Road (only in Muskoka; similar routes in unincorporated districts are usually provincial Secondary or Tertiary Highways)
MR = Municipal Road (for Single-Tier Municipalities)
RR = Regional Road (Not Rural Route)
CH = County Highway - some counties have the same number designation for two or more County Routes, but some (like Durham RM and the City of Norfolk County) also list routes as County Highways (CR HWY/RR HWY/DR HWY), abbreviated as CH. These are designations for downloaded former provincial highways. A prime example is Durham RR 2, and Durham RR HWY 2.

Counties

Bruce County

Dufferin County

Elgin County

Essex County

Frontenac County

Grey County

Haliburton County

Hastings County

Huron County

Lambton County

Lanark County

United Counties of Leeds and Grenville

Lennox and Addington County

Middlesex County

Northumberland County

Perth County

Peterborough County

United Counties of Prescott and Russell

Renfrew County

Simcoe County

United Counties of Stormont, Dundas and Glengarry

Wellington County

Regional/District Municipalities

Regional Municipality of Durham

Regional Municipality of Halton

District Municipality of Muskoka

Regional Municipality of Niagara

Oxford County

Regional Municipality of Peel 

 
 
Main Articles:
List of numbered roads in Peel Region
List of roads in Brampton (includes non-numbered Brampton roads)
List of roads in Mississauga (includes non-numbered Mississauga roads)

Regional Municipality of Waterloo

Regional Municipality of York

Single-tier municipalities

County of Brant

Chatham-Kent

Greater Sudbury

Haldimand County

Hamilton

Kawartha Lakes

Norfolk County

Ottawa 
Main Articles:
List of numbered roads in Ottawa
List of roads in Ottawa (includes non-numbered Ottawa roads)

Prince Edward County

Toronto 

Main Articles:
Metro Toronto Roads and Transportation (the present City of Toronto was formerly Metropolitan Toronto; a regional-level of goverenment that maintained a non-numbered system of major roads)
List of east-west roads in Toronto
List of diagonal roads in Toronto 
List of north-south roads in Toronto

References

External links 
 The Kings Highway
 Ontario Highways